The 2005 Northern Iowa Panthers football team represented the University of Northern Iowa in the 2005 NCAA Division I-AA football season. The previous year's team finished first (of nine) in the Gateway Football Conference. The team was coached by fifth year head coach Mark Farley and played their home games in the UNI-Dome.

Schedule

Rankings

Roster

Coaching staff

References

Northern Iowa
Northern Iowa Panthers football seasons
Missouri Valley Football Conference champion seasons
Northern Iowa Panthers football